The Alvis Three Litre TD21 was a British sports saloon or coupé made by Alvis cars between the end of 1958 and October 1963. It was a revised version of the TC 108G, the body was made by Park Ward who were better able to supply them to the quantity, quality, and price required. The cars were slightly taller and a drop-head coupé was added to the range, they were both lighter.

The 2993 cc engine was again uprated, now producing  mainly by an improved cylinder head and increasing the compression ratio from 8.0:1 to 8.5:1. A new four speed gearbox from the Austin-Healey appeared and Borg Warner three speed automatic transmission was offered. Overdrive was available on the manual transmission from late 1960 to 1962. Wire spoked wheels became an option. From 1959 the all drum brake set up was changed to discs at the front retaining drums at the rear.

The test car cost £2827 including taxes.

Series II
In April 1962 the car was upgraded with four wheel Dunlop disc brakes in place of the disc/drum combination and named Series II. Door frames were now constructed of aluminium for lightness as well as being panelled in aluminium to alleviate persistent problems with the Park Ward body's wooden door pillar.

The previously stand-alone fog lamps were built into the front of the car, recessed in the middle of new circular air intakes, one for the heater, the other for the carburettors.  The rear number plate and the various lamps and reversing lights were re-arranged.

In October that year there was a switch to a five speed manual ZF gearbox; the Borg-Warner automatic remained available as an option.

Graber Switzerland

Graber continued to mount their own bodies on the Alvis chassis.

References

Further reading
 
 

TD 21
Cars introduced in 1958
1960s cars